, born , is a Japanese music composer from Tokyo, Japan born October 4, 1971. He worked in the Nihon Falcom Corporation as one of the members of Falcom Sound Team J.D.K.. During his time with Falcom, he has composed much music for Falcom games, most notably Brandish.

Having known Makoto Shinkai as a coworker in Minori he has composed music for Shinkai's works since She and Her Cat. He is perhaps best known for creating the soundtracks for Shinkai's subsequent works, Voices of a Distant Star, The Place Promised in Our Early Days, 5 Centimeters Per Second and his final Shinkai collaboration being Children Who Chase Lost Voices from Deep Below. As of 2019, he has joined CoMix Wave Films,
but no further information is available about what he has done with them since; latest news indicate that he will not be reuniting with Shinkai for Suzume no Tojimari.

Project Promise

In 2009, an album, titled "Promise" ("新海誠作品イメージアルバム「Promise」"), performed by the Eminence Symphony Orchestra, based in Sydney, Australia, was released, celebrating ten years of collaboration between Tenmon and Makoto Shinkai.
It consists of orchestral arrangements of a variety of pieces composed by Tenmon appearing in a range of Makoto Shinkai's works.

Works
Tenmon has composed the soundtrack for:
She and Her Cat (1999)
Voices of a Distant Star (2001)
Mizu no Kakera (2001)
Tenshi no Kakera (2003)
Haru no Ashioto (2004)
The Place Promised in Our Early Days (2004)
Ef: A Fairy Tale of the Two. (2006) – with Eiichirō Yanagi
5 Centimeters Per Second (2007)
Ef: A Tale of Memories. (2007) – with Eiichirō Yanagi
Ef: A Tale of Melodies. (2008) – with Eiichirō Yanagi
Eden* They Were Only Two, On The Planet (2009)
Children Who Chase Lost Voices from Deep Below (2011)
Hoshi Ori Yume Mirai (2014) – with many others

His other works include an original album Chronicle released in 2012.

External links 
 Tenmon's official website

References 

1971 births
Anime composers
Japanese composers
Japanese film score composers
Japanese male composers
Japanese male film score composers
Living people